Lezo, officially the Municipality of Lezo (Aklanon: Banwa it Lezo; Hiligaynon: Banwa sang Lezo),  is a 5th class municipality in the province of Aklan, Philippines. It is the smallest municipality in the province both by population and by land area, and even by revenue. According to the 2020 census, it has a population of 15,639 people.

History

Before its creation into an independent municipality, Lezo was a barrio in Kalibo called Guicod derived from the word "Guicab" which means "a cavern in a creek where eels were in abundance", and was also known as Tierra Alta meaning a "high land" because the town center was not inundated during the great flood of the early 19th century.

When the Americans came in 1899, the military government appointed Felix Kimpo as head of the Calivo (covering the present territory of Kalibo, Numancia and Lezo). During the election in 1901 he was elected as the president from 1901 to 1903. At that time there were 34 towns in the province of Capiz, but these were reduced to 24 towns by a law passed by the civil Commission when it was found out that some towns were incapable of meeting their financial obligations and maintenance. So on April 4, 1903, through Act No. 720 of the Philippine Commission, Lezo, along with Numancia, and Banga was annexed to Kalibo for decreased of revenue collections.

On July 31, 1909, the civil commission issued Executive Order No. 58 separating Lezo (that includes Numancia) from Kalibo and making Lezo as the seat of government. Numancia then, became a barrio of Lezo. On December 31, 1916, through Act No. 2657, Lezo was part of the second district of the province of Capiz. On March 10, 1917, through Act No. 2711 Lezo was part of the third district of Capiz. In 1920 the situation was reversed with regards to the status of Lezo and Numancia. By Executive Order No. 17, series of 1920, the seat of government was transferred to Numancia and Lezo became a barrio of Numancia.

With several petitions by the residents over the years to separate from Numancia, President Manuel Quezon signed Executive Order No. 364 dated August 28, 1941 converting Lezo into an independent municipality. The inauguration of Lezo as a separate municipality was scheduled in 1942, but due to the outbreak of World War II it was deferred to January 1, 1945.

Geography

According to the Philippine Statistics Authority, the municipality has a land area of  constituting  of the  total area of Aklan.

Climate

Barangays
Lezo is politically subdivided into 12 barangays.

Demographics

In the 2020 census, Lezo had a population of 15,639.

Economy

Image gallery

References

External links

 [ Philippine Standard Geographic Code]
 Official Municipal Website

Municipalities of Aklan
Establishments by Philippine executive order